Igue festival (also known as  King’s Festival) is a celebration with its origin in the Benin Kingdom of Edo State, southern Nigeria. One tradition states that the festival date coincided with the marriage of Ewuare to a wife named Ewere. Celebrated between Christmas and New Year, the festival includes the Oba's blessing of the land and his people. During the Igue ritual season, the Oba is prohibited from being in the presence of any non-native person.

History 
The Igue Festival was initiated in the 14th century during the reign of Oba Ewuare I, who reigned in Benin between year 1440 and 1473. Following Oba Ewuare I's experience whilst fighting as a prince for the Benin throne, he was known as the Prince Ogun, the son of Oba Ohen as at then.

The Igue festival however now consists of several other festivals put together by the Oba Akenzua II. This is because he wanted the festival to last for couple of days due to the current movement of people and the Igue festival has become a terminal for many other festivals celebrated by the Benin people.

References

External links 
 The Igue Festival - Edo’s colourful festival

Festivals in Nigeria
Edo State
Cultural festivals in Nigeria